Otto Arnholz (12 April 1894 – 7 October 1988) was a German politician of the Social Democratic Party (SPD) and member of the German Bundestag.

Life 
Arnholz joined the SPD in 1920. In 1945/46 he was the regional chairman of the SPD Braunschweig and became a member of the appointed Braunschweig state parliament from 21 February 1946 to 21 November 1946. In May 1946 Arnholz became Minister of the Interior in the government of Prime Minister Alfred Kubel. With the formation of the state of Lower Saxony he left the government in November 1946. He was a member of the German Bundestag from its first election in 1949 to 1957. In parliament he represented the constituency of the city of Braunschweig.

Literature

References

1894 births
1988 deaths
Members of the Bundestag for Lower Saxony
Members of the Bundestag 1953–1957
Members of the Bundestag 1949–1953
Members of the Bundestag for the Social Democratic Party of Germany